Ruth Elke Lawrence-Neimark (born 2 August 1971) is a British–Israeli mathematician and an associate professor of mathematics at the Einstein Institute of Mathematics, Hebrew University of Jerusalem, and a researcher in knot theory and algebraic topology. Outside academia, she is best known for having been a child prodigy in mathematics.

Early life
Ruth Lawrence was born in Brighton, England. Her parents, Harry Lawrence and Sylvia Greybourne, were both computer consultants. When Lawrence was five, her father gave up his job so that he could educate her at home.

Education
At the age of nine, Lawrence gained an O-level in mathematics, setting a new age record (later surpassed in 2001 when Arran Fernandez successfully sat GCSE mathematics aged five). Also at the age of nine she achieved a Grade A at A-level pure mathematics.

In 1981 Lawrence passed the Oxford University entrance examination in mathematics, joining St Hugh's College in 1983 at the age of 12.

At Oxford, her father continued to be actively involved in her education, accompanying her to all lectures and some tutorials. Lawrence completed her bachelor's degree in two years, instead of the normal three, and graduated in 1985 at the age of 13 with a starred first and special commendation. Attracting considerable press interest, she became the youngest British person to gain a first-class degree, and the youngest to graduate from the University of Oxford in modern times.

Lawrence followed her first degree with a bachelor's degree in physics in 1986 and a Doctor of Philosophy (DPhil) degree in mathematics at Oxford in June 1989, at the age of 17. Her doctoral thesis title was Homology representations of braid groups and her thesis adviser was Sir Michael Atiyah.

Academic career
Lawrence and her father moved to America for Lawrence's first academic post, which was at Harvard University, where she became a junior fellow in 1990 at the age of 19. In 1993, she moved to the University of Michigan, where she became an associate professor with tenure in 1997.

In 1998, Lawrence married Ariyeh Neimark, a mathematician at the Hebrew University of Jerusalem, and adopted the name Ruth Lawrence-Neimark. The following year, she moved to Israel with him and took up the post of associate professor of mathematics at the Einstein Institute of Mathematics, a part of the Hebrew University of Jerusalem.

Research
Lawrence's 1990 paper, "Homological representations of the Hecke algebra", in Communications in Mathematical Physics, introduced, among other things, certain novel linear representations of the braid group — known as Lawrence–Krammer representations. In papers published in 2000 and 2001, Daan Krammer and Stephen Bigelow established the faithfulness of Lawrence's representation. This result goes by the phrase "braid groups are linear."

Awards and honors
In 2012 she became a fellow of the American Mathematical Society.

Selected publications
Lawrence, R.J.,An explicit symmetric DGLA model of a triangle, joint with Itay Griniasty (2018)
Lawrence, R.J.,A formula for topology/deformations and its significance,joint with Dennis Sullivan Fundamenta Mathematica 225 (2014) 229-242.
Lawrence, R.J., Homological representations of the Hecke algebra, Communications in Mathematical Physics, V 135, N 1, pp 141–191 (1990).
Lawrence, R. and Zagier, D., Modular forms and quantum invariants of 3-manifolds. Asian Journal of Mathematics, V 3, N 1, pp 93–108 (1999).
Lawrence, R. and Rozansky, L., Witten–Reshetikhin–Turaev Invariants of Seifert Manifolds. Communications in Mathematical Physics, V. 205, N 2, pp. 287–314 (1999).

References

External links
 Ruth Lawrence's home page at the Hebrew University of Jerusalem

1971 births
20th-century British mathematicians
21st-century British mathematicians
Alumni of St Hugh's College, Oxford
English mathematicians
Fellows of the American Mathematical Society
Harvard Fellows
Academic staff of the Hebrew University of Jerusalem
Israeli mathematicians
Living people
Topologists
University of Michigan faculty
British women mathematicians
20th-century women mathematicians
21st-century women mathematicians